Rajkanya is a 1965 Bengali film directed by Sunil Bandyopadhyay. The movie was based on a story and screenplay by legendary film director Ritwik Ghatak. Uttam Kumar, Rina Ghosh, Bhanu Bandopadhyay, and Tarun Kumar portray the main characters.

Technical team

 Story, Dialogues & Screenplay: Ritwik Ghatak
 Cinematography: Bijoy Ghosh
 Editor: Ardhendu Chattopadhyay
 Music: Shyamal Mitra
 Lyrics: Gouri Prasanna Majumdar
 Playback Singers: Shyamal Mitra and Asha Bhosle
 Art Director: Kartik Bose
 Dance Director: Shakti Nag

Cast

 Uttam Kumar
 Rina Ghosh
 Chandrabati Devi
 Gitali Ray
 Shekhar Chattopadhyay
 Ajit Chattopadhyay
 Bhanu Bandyopadhyay
 Satya Banerjee
 Shyam Laha
 Prasanto Kumar
 Gour Shree
 Pramatha Gangopadhyay

Songs

 E Jeno Ojana Ek Poth - Sung by Shyamal Mitra and picturized on Uttam Kumar
 Ei Sei Purnima Raat - Sung by Shyamal Mitra & Asha Bhonsle and picturized on Uttam Kumar & Rina Ghosh

References

Indian mystery films
Bengali-language Indian films
1965 films
Films based on Indian novels
Indian black-and-white films
1960s mystery films
1960s Bengali-language films